Wendell Preston Harris Jr. (born October 2, 1940) is a former American football defensive back in the National Football League in the 1960s. He played college football at Louisiana State University, where he guided the Tigers to the 1961 Southeastern Conference championship and an Orange Bowl victory over Colorado. 

Harris was drafted by the Baltimore Colts in the 1962 NFL Draft.
Harris, a first-round draft pick out of LSU became an NFL kick and punt returner who played in other offensive positions as well, beginning his career in 1962 with the Baltimore Colts, coached by Weeb Ewbank. Assigned to both special teams and right cornerback, he returned 10 kicks or punts; his yards per return were 28.7, highest among his special-teammates. (All statistics here were gathered from pro-football-reference.com.)

Sharing the field in 1963 with such players as Johnny Unitas, and now coached by Don Shula, Harris returned 8 kicks for 198 yards, including a 41-yard run. His yards per return, 24.8, were eclipsed only by John Mackey's. For the year Harris wracked up 1,000 yards, his team achieving 3rd place in the NFL West.

As Shula built the team, pushing it to 1st in the NFL West in 1964, Harris, #26, picked up 17 kicks and carried them for 214 yards, including a run of 39 yards. He also intercepted a ball for a 20-yard run.

In 1966 Harris moved to the New York Giants, a season of misery coached by Allie Sherman that left the Giants 8th in their division. Harris spent that longest season as a long-snapper for punters, with a total annual yardage of 9 for the year.

References

1940 births
Living people
Players of American football from Baton Rouge, Louisiana
American football defensive backs
LSU Tigers football players
Baltimore Colts players
New York Giants players